W2, W-2, or w2 may refer to:

 W2 (tram), a class of electric trams built by the Melbourne & Metropolitan Tramways Board
 W2, the Welsh version of television station BBC Two
 W2, one of four manuscripts of the Magnus Liber
 W2, a postcode district in the W postcode area of the United Kingdom
w2 Concertzaal, a pop stage in 's-Hertogenbosch, The Netherlands
 W-2 tool steel, a water-hardening variety of high carbon steel
 Apple W2, a wireless chip used in the Apple Watch Series 3
 Arado W 2, a two-seat twin-engine seaplane trainer
 British NVC community W2, a Woodland and scrub community in the British National Vegetation Classification system
 Form W-2, a United States federal tax form issued by employers and stating how much an employee was paid in a year
The Vector W2, a concept car
 Wisconsin Works, a workforce development and welfare replacement program in Wisconsin (a form of Workfare)
 Perfect World (video game), also known as PW and World2, 3D MMORPG game
 Webster's New International Dictionary, Second Edition
 Third step of the W0-W6 scale for the classification of meteorites by weathering
 Windows 2.0x, a Microsoft operating system

See also
 2W (disambiguation)
 W3 (disambiguation)